Finland was represented by Fredi, with the song "Varjoon – suojaan", at the 1967 Eurovision Song Contest, which took place on 8 April in Vienna.

Before Eurovision

National final
The Finnish national final took place on February 11 at the YLE TV Studios in Helsinki. The show was hosted by Jaakko Jahnukainen. The winner was chosen by a professional jury in two rounds of voting. In the first round top 3 songs were chosen and in the second round the winner was chosen.

At Eurovision
On the night of the final Fredi performed eighth in the running order, following Sweden and preceding Germany. The Finnish entry was conducted by Ossi Runne. At the close of voting, Finland picked up three points and placed joint 12th with Portugal of the 17 entries.

Voting

Sources
Viisukuppila, Muistathan: Suomen karsinnat 1967 
Finnish national final 1967 on natfinals

1967
Countries in the Eurovision Song Contest 1967
Eurovision